The Chinese pipistrelle (Hypsugo pulveratus) is a species of vesper bat in the family Vespertilionidae. It is found in China, Laos, Thailand, and Vietnam.

Taxonomy

References

Hypsugo
Mammals described in 1870
Taxonomy articles created by Polbot
Taxa named by Wilhelm Peters
Bats of Asia